Blanchinus is a lunar impact crater that is situated in the rugged south-central highlands of the Moon. The crater is named after Italian astronomer Giovanni Bianchini whose Latinized name is Blanchinus. Adjacent to the south of Blanchinus is the crater Werner, and La Caille is attached to the northwest rim. West of the crater is the prominent formation Purbach.

The outer rim of Blanchinus has been significantly degraded by subsequent impacts, leaving an irregular, notched exterior ring of rugged hills and ridges. The inner floor, in contrast, is nearly flat and free of significant impacts. Only a few tiny craterlets mark the interior surface, with Blanchinus M located near the midpoint and the remainder lie near the southwest rim.

For a few hours before the first quarter, the crater's rim contributes the lunar x visual phenomenon.

Satellite craters

By convention these features are identified on lunar maps by placing the letter on the side of the crater midpoint that is closest to Blanchinus.

References

External links

 

Impact craters on the Moon